Ainslie may refer to:

People
 Ainslie baronets
 Ainslie (name)

Places
 Ainslie, Australian Capital Territory, a suburb of Canberra, Australia
 Ainslie Wood (disambiguation), multiple places
 Lake Ainslie, largest natural freshwater lake in Nova Scotia, Canada
 Mount Ainslie, a hill in the suburbs of Canberra

Other uses
 Ainslie Football Club, semi-professional Australian rules football club based in Canberra
 Harrison Ainslie, former firm of ironmasters and iron ore merchants
 Ainslie Tavern Bond, Scottish document signed on about 20 April 1567

See also
 Ainslee (disambiguation)
 Ansley
 Annesley (disambiguation)
 Aynsley